Interhotel was an East German chain of luxury hotels. It was founded in 1965 as a chain.

Originally, the hotel chain consisted of a hotel each in Berlin, Erfurt, Jena and Magdeburg, two hotels in Chemnitz (then Karl-Marx-Stadt) and five hotels in Leipzig.

5-star hotels were exclusively for guests from non-socialist states, 4-star hotels were mainly for guests from Comecon countries, for example, Park Inn Berlin (then Stadt Berlin) was built for Soviet people. There were also some 3-star hotels in smaller towns, such as "Hotel Elephant" in Weimar.

Practically all luxury hotels in East Germany were part of the Interhotel chain, notable exceptions being hotel "Neptun" in Warnemünde and Cecilienhof castle in Potsdam.  The Verband Deutscher Konsumgenossenschaften (VDK), the union of consumer co-operatives in the GDR also ran hotels, mainly 4 star and three star hotels such as the Konsum Erholungsheim in Oberhof, which is still part of what remains of the co-operative movement in Germany.

After German reunification, most of the hotels were still run by Interhotel AG. In 1991, some hotels were sold to the Klingbeil group, and in December 2006 some were sold to the Blackstone Group.

The Interhotel hotels were under the control of the East German state security service, the Stasi, under the Tourist Department. The Stasi tried to monitor the activities of international tourists, by sending prostitutes to audio- and video-controlled hotel rooms. They focused on hotels where political decisions were discussed, such as Hotel Bellevue in Dresden.

List of Interhotel hotels

Berlin
 Hotel Berolina - Opened 1964, closed 1995, demolished 1996
 Hotel Unter den Linden - Opened 1966, demolished 2006
 Hotel Stadt Berlin - Opened 1970, renamed Forum Hotel Berlin 1993, renamed Park Inn by Radisson Berlin Alexanderplatz 2003
 Hotel Metropol - Opened 1977, renamed Maritim Hotel Metropol 1992, rebuilt and renamed Maritim proArte Hotel Berlin 2000
 Palasthotel - Opened 1979, renamed Radisson SAS Hotel Berlin 1992, closed 2000, demolished 2001 for construction of a new Radisson SAS Hotel Berlin, renamed Radisson Blu Hotel Berlin 2009
 Grand Hotel Berlin - Opened 1987, renamed Maritim Grand Hotel Berlin 1992, renamed The Westin Grand Berlin 1997
 Domhotel - Opened 1990, renamed Hilton Berlin 1991

Dresden
 Hotel Astoria - Opened 1950, closed 1992, demolished 1998
 Motel Dresden - Opened 1967, renamed Hotel am Bismarckturm 1990, closed and demolished soon after
 Hotel Bastei - Opened May 1969, renamed ibis Dresden Bastei 1992, renamed ibis Dresden Zentrum 2017 in joint operation with the Königstein 
 Hotel Königstein - Opened Autumn 1969, renamed ibis Dresden Königstein 1992, renamed ibis Dresden Zentrum 2017 in joint operation with the Bastei
 Hotel Lilienstein - Opened Autumn 1969, renamed ibis Dresden Lilienstein 1992, renamed The Student Hotel Dresden 2018, renamed Dresden Zentrum Hotel 2022, becomes Holiday Inn Express in 2024, following renovations
 Hotel Newa - Opened 1970, renamed Hotel Mercure Newa Dresden 1992, renamed Hotel Pullman Dresden Newa 2008
 Hotel Bellevue - Opened 1985, renamed Maritim Hotel Bellevue 1992, renamed Hotel Bellevue 1996, renamed The Westin Bellevue Dresden 2000, renamed Bilderberg Bellevue Hotel Dresden 2020
 Hotel Dresdner Hof - Opened 1990, renamed Hilton Dresden 1992

Erfurt
 Hotel Erfurter Hof - Built 1904, opened as an Interhotel in 1965, closed 1995
 Hotel Kosmos - Opened 1980, renamed Radisson SAS Hotel Erfurt 1995, renamed Radisson Blu Hotel Erfurt 2009

Gera
 Hotel Gera - Opened 1967, renamed Maritim Hotel Gera 1992, demolished 1997

Halle
 Hotel Stadt Halle - Opened 1966, renamed Maritim Hotel Halle 1992, converted to refugee housing 2016, closed 2017

Jena
 Hotel International - Opened 1963, became an Interhotel 1965, demolished 1997

Karl-Marx-Stadt
 Hotel Chemnitzer Hof - Opened 1930, became an Interhotel 1965, renamed Günnewig Hotel Chemnitzer Hof 1992, renamed Hotel Chemnitzer Hof 2017
 Hotel Moskau - Opened 1962, became an Interhotel 1965, renamed Günnewig Hotel Europa 1992, renamed Hotel an der Oper 2008
 Hotel Kongress - Opened 1974, renamed Mercure Hotel Kongress Chemnitz 1992, renamed Dorint Kongresshotel Chemnitz 2018

Leipzig
 Hotel International - Opened 1890 as Hotel Fürstenhof, renamed Hotel International after WWII, became an Interhotel 1965, closed 1993, reopened as Hotel Fürstenhof Kempinski Leipzig 1996, renamed Hotel Fürstenhof 2000
 Hotel Astoria - Opened 1915, became an Interhotel 1965, renamed Maritim Hotel Astoria 1992, closed 1996
 Hotel Stadt Leipzig - Opened 1964, became an Interhotel 1965, closed 1992 and demolished for construction of Hotel Novotel Leipzig City
 Hotel Deutschland - Opened 1965, renamed Hotel Am Ring 1973, renamed Hotel Deutschland 1990, renamed Hotel Mercure am Augustusplatz 1992, renamed Radisson SAS Hotel Leipzig 2007, renamed Radisson Blu Hotel Leipzig 2009
 Hotel Zum Löwen - Opened 1965, renamed Holiday Inn Garden Court Leipzig City Centre 1995, later renamed Best Western Hotel Leipzig City Center
 Hotel Merkur - Opened 1981, renamed InterContinental Leipzig 1993, renamed The Westin Leipzig 2003

Magdeburg
 Hotel International - Opened 1963, became an Interhotel 1965, demolished 1993, Maritim Hotel Magdeburg opened on the site 1995

Neubrandenburg
 Hotel Vier Tore - Opened 1950s, became an Interhotel 1989/90, renamed Radisson SAS Hotel Neubrandenburg, renamed Radisson Blu Hotel Neubrandenburg 2009, demolished 2016

Oberhof
 Hotel Panorama - Opened 1969, renamed Ramada Treff Hotel Panorama Oberhof, then Treff Hotel Panorama Oberhof, then AHORN Panorama Hotel Oberhof 2018

Potsdam
 Hotel Potsdam - Opened 1969, renamed Mercure Hotel Potsdam 1992

Rostock
 Hotel Warnow - Opened 1967, renamed Radisson SAS Hotel Rostock 1992, demolished 2001 for construction of a new Radisson SAS Hotel Rostock which opened in 2005, renamed Radisson Blu Hotel Rostock 2009

Suhl
 Hotel Thüringen-Tourist - Opened 1968, renamed Hotel Thüringen Suhl, later renamed Michel Hotel Suhl

Weimar
 Hotel Elephant Founded 1696, current structure opened 1938, became an Interhotel 1966
 Hotel Belvedere - Opened 1992 as Hilton Weimar, renamed Leonardo Hotel Weimar 2007

Gallery

References

1965 establishments in East Germany
Hotel chains in Germany
Hotel and leisure companies of Germany
Companies of East Germany